Jeanne Labrune (born 21 June 1950) is a French screenwriter and film director. She has directed 13 films since 1978. Her film Sand and Blood was screened in the Un Certain Regard section at the 1988 Cannes Film Festival.

Selected filmography
 Sand and Blood (1988)
 Vatel (2000)
 Tomorrow's Another Day (2000)
 Special Delivery  (2002)
 Cause toujours! (2004)
 Special Treatment (2010)

References

External links
 

1950 births
Living people
French film directors
French women film directors
French women screenwriters
French screenwriters